The 2022 Panjgur and Naushki raids were a series of attacks on the Pakistani Frontier Corps in Balochistan claimed by the Balochistan Nationalist Army (BLA), a newly formed Balochi separatist group with ties to the Balochistan Liberation Army. On February 2, the militants attacked both the Frontier Corps base in Nushki and an outpost in Panjgur District, as part of the insurgency in Balochistan.

Pakistani authorities said that the BLA militants were assisted by Afghanistan and India during the attacks, and that the attackers had state-of-the-art equipment and weaponry obtained from abandoned US military caches in Afghanistan after the 2021 Fall of Kabul which included M-16s, M4 carbines, night vision goggles, bullet-proof vests, and many US-made sniper rifles and pistols.

See also 
 Frontier Corps
 Balochistan
 Research and Analysis Wing
 Terrorist incidents in Pakistan in 2022

References 

February 2022 events in Pakistan
February 2022 crimes in Asia
Terrorist incidents in Pakistan in 2022
Balochistan Liberation Army attacks
2022 in Balochistan, Pakistan
Terrorist incidents in Balochistan, Pakistan